Samuel Haynes (1899 - 1971) was a Belizean soldier, activist and poet best known for writing the national anthem of Belize, Land of the Free.

Life and career
He was a leader of the 1919 riot by Belizean soldiers who had fought in the First World War and refused to accept racial discrimination back home. In 1925, he composed the lyrics of a song named "Land of the Gods", which later became Belize's national anthem, "Land of the Free".

Also, prominent in the Marcus Garvey's Universal Negro Improvement Association, Haynes was once the President of the Pittsburgh Division, editor/writer for the Negro World and for a brief period the Official American Representative for the UNIA-ACL 1929 under the Honorable Marcus Garvey.

References

Sources
 "BELIZE : Belize National Anthem - Land of the Free"
 SilverTorch Belize Quiz

1899 births
1971 deaths
Belizean poets
Belizean military personnel
National anthem writers
Universal Negro Improvement Association and African Communities League members
British West Indies Regiment soldiers
20th-century Belizean writers